Catch Me If You Can (stylized as Catch Me... If You Can) is a 1989 American action comedy film starring Matt Lattanzi, Loryn Locklin, Grant Heslov, Geoffrey Lewis and M. Emmet Walsh. The film was the feature film directorial debut of writer and director Stephen Sommers, with a soundtrack by Tangerine Dream.

Synopsis 
The movie follows the antics of high school students and their adventure in saving their school from being closed. Class president Melissa (Loryn Locklin) has started raising money through donations to keep the school open, but when the fundraising begins to slow down, Dylan (Matt Lattanzi) convinces Melissa that he can save the school. They take $3000 of the money that has already been raised to bet on an illegal car race that Dylan is convinced he will win. Dylan doesn't win the race, and in order to get their money back, he is forced to double down on an impossible race against the clock that only the town legend has ever accomplished. The film ends with a spectacular stunt as car and driver jump through the goalposts during a football game between two local high schools, Apollo and Cathedral.

Cast 
Matt Lattanzi as Dylan Malone
Loryn Locklin as Melissa Hanson
Grant Heslov as Nevil
Billy Morrissette as Monkey
Geoffrey Lewis as Mr. Johnson
M. Emmet Walsh as Johnny Phatmun

Production 
The film was shot on location throughout St. Cloud, Minnesota (where Sommers grew up), and at Cathedral High School and Apollo High School, which Sommers attended. It was funded independently and had a budget of $800,000. The film was Sommers's directorial debut and was written by him. When production finished, the studio that had promised to distribute the movie had gone out of business, and it was eventually released by MCA Inc. in July 1989. The movie did not fare well at the box office, grossing only $3686 in its domestic run, but it made $7 million overseas.

The movie featured local residents cast as extras in the production and many of the hot-rods, classic cars and muscle cars featured in the race scenes were owned by central Minnesota residents. Sommers went on to achieve success directing the 1999 film The Mummy and its 2001 sequel The Mummy Returns.

The movie is rated PG in New Zealand.

Soundtrack 
The film's soundtrack was performed and recorded by Tangerine Dream. It is their 20th soundtrack album and 50th album overall. All tracks were composed by Edgar Froese and Paul Haslinger.

References

External links 

1989 films
1980s action comedy films
American auto racing films
American action comedy films
Films directed by Stephen Sommers
Films scored by Tangerine Dream
Films set in Minnesota
1989 directorial debut films
Films shot in Minnesota
1980s English-language films
1980s American films